Manuel Luís da Silva Cafumana (born 6 March 1999), commonly known as Show or Chow, is an Angolan professional footballer who plays as a midfielder for Bulgarian club Ludogorets Razgrad.

Honors

Angola
Four Nations Tournament bronze medal: 2018

Career statistics

Club

Notes

International

International goals
Scores and results list Angola's goal tally first.

Honours
Ludogorets Razgrad
First Professional Football League: 2021–22
Bulgarian Supercup: 2022

References

External links
 

1999 births
Living people
Angolan footballers
Angola international footballers
Association football midfielders
Primeira Liga players
First Professional Football League (Bulgaria) players
C.D. Primeiro de Agosto players
Girabola players
Lille OSC players
Boavista F.C. players
PFC Ludogorets Razgrad players
Angolan expatriate sportspeople in France
Angolan expatriate footballers
Expatriate footballers in France
Expatriate footballers in Bulgaria
2019 Africa Cup of Nations players